The United States Naval Radiological Defense Laboratory (NRDL) was an early military lab created to study the effects of radiation and nuclear weapons. The facility was based at the Hunter's Point Naval Shipyard in San Francisco, California.

History
The NRDL was formed in 1946 to manage testing, decontamination, and disposition of US Navy ships contaminated by the Operation Crossroads nuclear tests in the Pacific. A number of ships that survived the atomic detonations were towed to Hunter's Point for detailed study and decontamination. Some of the ships were cleaned and sold for scrap. The aircraft carrier , which had been heavily damaged and contaminated with nuclear fallout by Operation Crossroads explosions in July 1946, was brought to the NRDL for study. After years of trying in vain to decontaminate the ship enough that it could be safely sold for scrap, the Navy ultimately packed the ship full of nuclear waste and scuttled the radioactive hulk off California near the Farallon Islands in January 1951. The ship's wreck was discovered resting upright under 790 m of water in 2009.

The NRDL used several buildings at the Hunter's Point shipyard from 1946 to 1969. Working with the newly formed US Atomic Energy Commission (predecessor to the U.S. Nuclear Regulatory Commission established in 1974), the Navy conducted a wide variety of radiation experiments on materials and animals at the lab, including the construction of a cyclotron on the site for use in radiation experiments and storage for various nuclear materials.

Activities
An article published 2 May 2001 in SF Weekly detailed various aspects of nuclear testing at NRDL from declassified records:

Contamination
The first use of radioactive materials at NRDL predated the issuing of licenses by the Atomic Energy Commission, but the AEC later issued licenses for a broad spectrum of radioactive materials to be used in research at the NRDL. Radioactive materials specific to nuclear weapon testing were exempted from AEC licensing. For closure of the NRDL in 1969, the AEC issued licenses for decommissioning activities. AEC licenses for the shipyard and NRDL were terminated in the 1970s.

The NRDL testing and decontamination activities caused significant contamination of the shipyard site. The NRDL and the military radiation training school at nearby Naval Station Treasure Island loaded the nuclear waste left from experiments into steel barrels and sent weekly barges to dump them offshore near the Gulf of the Farallons, which is a US National Wildlife Refuge and a major commercial fishery. Between 1946 and 1970, records estimate the lab and naval station dumped an estimated 47,000 drums of nuclear waste in the Pacific Ocean 30 miles west of San Francisco, creating the first and largest offshore nuclear waste dump in the United States. The USGS states the barrels contain only "low-level radioactive waste," but this is disputed by historical records and experts.

The US Navy completed a Historical Radiological Assessment of the Hunter's Point Shipyard in 2004, including the known NRDL facilities on the property, years after the SF Weekly article cited declassified documents showing that many sites and buildings used by NRDL were not included in the Navy's list of sites with potential for radiological contamination. Many of the buildings formerly used by NRDL had been razed by that point.

The former shipyard site is still being decontaminated, and has been split into multiple parcels to allow the Navy to declare them clean and safe for redevelopment separately. While Lennar has built and sold hundreds of new condominium units on the site of the former Hunters Point Naval Shipyard, regulators, activists, and cleanup workers have claimed that the site is still heavily contaminated and that the company contracted to handle the cleanup and testing, Tetra Tech, has repeatedly violated established cleanup protocols, deliberately falsified radiation test results at the site to falsely show that there is little remaining radiation, and fired employees who attempted to force workers to perform radiation tests as required.

References

External links
 
 

Installations of the United States Navy in California
Nuclear technology
Military science
Pollution
United States Navy installations
United States Navy shipyards
Naval Shipyard
Naval Shipyard
Military Superfund sites
1870 establishments in California
Superfund sites in California
Military facilities in the San Francisco Bay Area
Military in the San Francisco Bay Area
Ships involved in Operation Crossroads
Military research of the United States
Bayview–Hunters Point, San Francisco